Daviesia oxylobium is a species of flowering plant in the family Fabaceae and is endemic to the south-west of Western Australia. It is an erect, bushy shrub with sharply-pointed, cylindrical phyllodes, and yellow and pinkish-red flowers.

Description

Taxonomy and naming
Daviesia oxylobium was first formally described in 1995 by Michael Crisp in Australian Systematic Botany from specimens he collected near Quairading in 1980. The specific epithet (oxylobium) means "a sharp pod".

Distribution and habitat
This daviesia grows in kwongan or woodland between Quairading, Corrigin, Bruce Rock and Yorkrakine in the Avon Wheatbelt and Jarrah Forest biogeographic regions of south-western Western Australia.

Conservation status
Daviesia oxylobium is listed as "Priority Four" by the Government of Western Australia Department of Biodiversity, Conservation and Attractions, meaning that it is rare or near threatened.

References

oxylobium
Eudicots of Western Australia
Plants described in 1995
Taxa named by Michael Crisp